Puerto Rico Highway 722 (PR-722) is a rural road located in Aibonito, Puerto Rico. It begins at its intersection with PR-14 east of downtown Aibonito and ends at the Ruta Panorámica between Robles and Pasto barrios. The traditional Festival de las Flores is celebrated near this road.

Major intersections

Related route

Puerto Rico Highway 7722 (PR-7722) is a segment of the Ruta Panorámica that travels from Cayey to Aibonito. It begins at PR-1 between Pasto Viejo and Pedro Ávila barrios and ends at PR-722 in Robles.

See also

 List of highways numbered 722

References

External links

 PR-722, Aibonito, Puerto Rico

722
Aibonito, Puerto Rico